FC Ala-Too Naryn is a Kyrgyzstani football club based in Naryn, Kyrgyzstan that played in the top division in Kyrgyzstan, the Kyrgyzstan League.

History
Ala-Too Naryn was founded in 1992, taking part in the first season of the Kyrgyzstan League, finishing in 12th place before disbanding at the end of the season.

Ala-Too Naryn was revived in 2012 as a farm club to Dordoi Bishkek.

Domestic history

References
  Ala-too squad

External links 
Career stats by KLISF (only 1992)

Football clubs in Kyrgyzstan